INK (for I/O Node Kernel) is the operating system that runs on the input output nodes of the IBM Blue Gene supercomputer. INK is a Linux-derivative.

See also
 Compute Node Linux
 Timeline of operating systems
 Rocks Cluster Distribution
 Cray Linux Environment

References

Linux kernel variant
Supercomputer operating systems